Atlantean Chronicles is a 1970 study of Atlantis by Henry M. Eichner. It was first published in 1971 by  Fantasy Publishing Company, Inc. in an edition of 1,250 copies. An abridged version of the book was later serialized in the Perry Rhodan books.

References

1971 books
Atlantis in fiction
Fantasy Publishing Company, Inc. books